Marek Košút (born 26 September 1988 in Považská Bystrica) is a Slovak football striker who currently plays for 4. liga club FC Slovan Galanta.

References

External links
 at fcnitra.sk 

1988 births
Living people
Slovak footballers
Association football forwards
FC Nitra players
FK Slovan Duslo Šaľa players
Slovak Super Liga players
Sportspeople from Považská Bystrica